Khanna is a Khatri clan of the Dhai Ghar community.

Notable people

Activists 

 Prem Krishna Khanna, Indian freedom fighter who was arrested in the Kakori conspiracy case against the British Empire, and was prosecuted

Actors 

 Akshaye Khanna, Indian actor
 Chahat Khanna, Indian actress
 Gaurav Khanna, Indian actor
Geeta Khanna (voice actress), Indian voice actor
Mukesh Khanna, Indian actor who played the role of Shaktimaan
Padma Khanna (born 1949), Indian actress
Paul Khanna, British-Indian actor
Raashi Khanna, Indian actress
Ragini Khanna, Indian actress
Rahul Khanna, Indian actor
Rajesh Khanna, Indian actor
Ravi Khanna, Indian actor, journalist and writer
Rinke Khanna, Indian actress
Shalini Khanna, Indian actress
Sucheta Khanna, Indian actress
Tarun Khanna, Indian actor
Twinkle Khanna, Indian actress
Vinod Khanna, Indian actor
Shiva Amit Khanna, Indian Astrologer
Naisha Khanna, Indian child actress

Athletes 

 Anilkumar Khanna, Indian cricketer
 Dinesh Khanna, Indian badminton player who was first and only Indian to win a gold medal in Badminton Asia Championships. He also won bronze medal in Asian Games.
 Gaurav Khanna, Indian para-badminton Team Head National Coach
 Pooja Khanna, India's first ever Paralympic Archery player. She debuted at the 2016 Rio Olympics.
 Satish Khanna, Indian cricketer
 Surinder Khanna, Indian cricketer

Creatives 

 Amit Khanna (photographer), film director, writer, film producer, actor and fashion photographer
 Anamika Khanna, Indian fashion designer
 Balraj Khanna, Indian author and artist
 Bishamber Khanna, Indian painter and enamellist.
 Krishen Khanna, Padma Bhushan winning Indian artist
 Derek Khanna, American conservative political commentator and columnist.
 Ranjana Khanna,  literary critic and theorist recognized for her interdisciplinary, feminist and internationalist contributions
 Radhika Khanna, Indian fashion designer
 Shipra Khanna, Indian celebrity chef who won the second season of the Indian television show MasterChef 
 Usha Khanna, Indian music director in Hindi cinema.
 Vikas Khanna, Indian celebrity chef

Businesspeople and entrepreneurs 

 Aditya Khanna, Indian entrepreneur and investor
Amit Khanna, He was the founder chairman of Reliance Entertainment and former president of the Producers Guild of India
Navin Khanna, Indian businessman
Nitin Khanna, Indian-born entrepreneur settled in Portland, Oregon, United States. He is the founder of MergerTech.
Vipin Khanna, Indian businessman and retired Indian Army officer
ShivaAmit Khanna, Indian Astrologer Indian Astrologer He is the founder of Devayah.

Executives 
 Gopal Khanna, Minnesota's first Chief Information Officer (CIO)
 Rajinder Khanna, former chief of the Research and Analysis Wing (RAW), the external intelligence agency of India. 
 Roma Khanna, television and digital media executive. She has previously served as the CEO of Revolt TV
 K.C.Khanna, former Chairman and Managing Director, Steel Authority of India Limited SAIL

Lawyers 

 Hans Raj Khanna, Judge in Supreme Court of India
 Sanjiv Khanna, Judge of the Supreme Court of India.
 Vikramaditya Khanna, Indo-American lawyer and professor of law at the University of Michigan Law School

Politicians 

 Arvind Khanna, Indian senior Bhartiya Janta Party politician, businessman and philanthropist
Avinash Rai Khanna, Indian politician who served as Vice Chairman, Indian Red Cross Society and Vice President of Bhartiya Janta Party.
Harish Khanna, Indian politician
Mehr Chand Khanna, Indian politician who served as the Union Minister for Rehabilitation from 1954 to 1962
Ro Khanna (born 1976), American politician
Suresh Kumar Khanna, Indian politician
Tejendra Khanna, former Lieutenant Governor of Delhi

Scientists 
Faqir Chand Khanna, Indian nuclear physicist who was awarded the status of Fellow in the American Physical Society
Gaurav Khanna,  Indian-American black hole physicist, supercomputing innovator, academic and researcher.
Kum Kum Khanna, Indian molecular biologist and professor. She has made discoveries in identifying single-stranded DNA binding proteins, hSSB1 and hSSB2
Parag Khanna,  Indian American specialist in geopolitics and globalization
Rajnish Khanna,  Indian-American photobiologist and research scientist at Stanford University.
Renu Khanna Chopra, Indian scientist
Sanjeev Khanna, Indian-American computer scientist
Tarun Khanna (born 1968), Indian-born American academic, author, and an economic strategist. He is currently the Jorge Paulo Lemann professor at Harvard Business School
Rita Khanna Indian-Australian scientist, author, She has extensive research experience in high temperature metallurgical processes, iron and steelmaking, computer simulations, disordered materials, sustainable recycling and waste management, nanoscale carbons, foams and structures, carbon-based oxide refractories etc. Her research has received over 1600 citations. She has 161 publications to her credit: 2 edited books, 13 book chapters, 118 journal and 28 conference papers.

References

Surnames
Khatri clans
Surnames of Indian origin
Khatri surnames
Punjabi-language surnames
Indian surnames
Hindu surnames